Lee Edward Evans (February 25, 1947 – May 19, 2021) was an American sprinter. He won two gold medals in the 1968 Summer Olympics, setting world records in the 400 meters and the 4 × 400 meters relay, both of which stood for 20 and 24 years respectively. Evans co-founded the Olympic Project for Human Rights and was part of the athlete's boycott and the Black Power movement.

Early life and education
Lee Edward Evans was born on February 25, 1947, in Madera, California to Dayton and Pearlie Mae Evans. At the age of four, his family moved to Fresno. During his childhood, he harvested grapes and picked cotton in fields with his brothers and sisters. He attended Madison Elementary School and in his last year there trained for his first race by racing his friends at school. Evans went on to Central Union High School where he was classified in the C class for the 660 yard dash due to his height, weight, and age. Due to his mother contracting Valley fever, the Evans family moved to San Jose, California, during Lee's sophomore year. While running for Overfelt High School, Evans was undefeated, improving his 440-yard time from 48.2 in 1964 to 46.9 in 1965.

Evans was a Fulbright scholar in sociology and attended San Jose State, where he was coached by Hall of Famer Bud Winter. In 1966 as a freshman, he won his first AAU championship in 440 yd (402.34 m). He won the AAU title four years in a row (1966–1969) and again in 1972 and added the NCAA 400 m title in 1968.  His only defeat during that streak came at the hands of San Jose State teammate Tommie Smith.  The two were so competitive, Winter could not let them practice together.

Evans achieved his first world record in 1966, as a member of the USA national team which broke the 4 × 400 m relay record at Los Angeles, the first team to better 3 minutes (2:59.6) in the event. The next year he helped break the 4 x 220 yd (201.17 m) relay world record at Fresno in a time of 1:22.1. In 1967, Evans won the 400 metres at the Pan American Games, in an automatic time of 44.95, which (in the era of hand times) was the first bona fide automatic time to break 45 seconds.

Olympics 
Evans was an influential leader in regards to the Black Power movement. The Olympic Project for Human Rights began with black students protesting in order to have equal housing opportunities and was made into the black power movement after a Tommie Smith interview. Tommie Smith and John Carlos were the face of the movement, but Smith and Evans were the driving forces behind the movement. Carlos was said to have not even come to any of the meetings of the group, but when it came time to be in the spotlight he took his chance and claimed his spot in the history books.

The black athletes of the 1968 Mexico City Olympics chose not to protest the Olympics as a whole, instead they chose to protest by wearing an article of black clothing during every event in which they participated. Evans wanted the world to understand the way he felt about the Mexico City Olympic Games but did not want to take away from the winners and the sports themselves. In regards to the South African Olympic Ban, Vince Matthews asked Evans what would happen after the verdict because of his position as OPHR organizer. Evans replied that it was unclear as to what the International Olympic Committee would decide, but whatever the decision was the United States Olympic Team would stick together. Evans received death threats prior to and during the Olympics and claimed that had he not had these threats on his mind he probably could have run faster than he did, even though he broke a world record.

Evans won the 1968 Olympic trials at Echo Summit, California with a world record 44.06 and demolished it in the Olympic final, winning in 43.86 seconds aged 21 years and 8 months, from which he still stands as the thirteenth best performer in history. Evans won a second gold as the anchorman on the 4 × 400 m relay team, setting another world record of 2:56.16. Both times stood as a world record for almost twenty years (the relay, for almost 24 years). While accepting the relay Gold medal Evans and fellow African-American medalists Larry James and Ron Freeman received their medals wearing black berets in imitation of the Black Panther Party. After winning the AAU 400 m titles in 1969 and 1972, Evans finished only fourth in the 1972 Olympic trials, but was named a member of the 4 × 400 m relay team once more. However, when the time came the United States could not field a team because Vincent Matthews and Wayne Collett were suspended by the IOC for a demonstration at a medal ceremony similar to the one staged by Tommie Smith and John Carlos at the previous Olympics.

Post-Olympics 
Evans became a professional after the 1972 season joining the International Track Association (ITA) tour. He had some success on the ITA tour notably setting a 600 m indoors world best at the first meet in Idaho State University's Minidome. The ITA folded in 1976 and Evans was reinstated as an amateur in 1980 and ran a 46.5 in one of his few appearances that year, at the age of thirty-three.

Evans went on to head the national athletics programs in six different African nations before accepting a position as head cross country/track & field coach at the University of South Alabama.
Evans' college and amateur careers as well as his involvement in the Civil Rights Movement are chronicled in Frank Murphy's The Last Protest: Lee Evans in Mexico City. Evans was inducted into the United States National Track and Field Hall of Fame in 1983.

In 2011, Evans was diagnosed with "a large tumor in the pituitary gland area of his brain" and underwent surgery. He was banned from coaching for four years in 2014 when a 16-year-old Nigerian girl he was coaching tested positive for a banned steroid after he advised her to take supplements.

In May 2021, Evans had a stroke and was hospitalized in Lagos, Nigeria. He died on May 19, 2021 at the age of 74.

References

External links

 
 
 

1947 births
2021 deaths
People from Madera, California
Track and field athletes from San Jose, California
American male sprinters
Athletes (track and field) at the 1967 Pan American Games
Athletes (track and field) at the 1968 Summer Olympics
Olympic gold medalists for the United States in track and field
World record setters in athletics (track and field)
Doping cases in athletics
American sportspeople in doping cases
San Jose State Spartans men's track and field athletes
Medalists at the 1968 Summer Olympics
Pan American Games gold medalists for the United States
Pan American Games medalists in athletics (track and field)
Medalists at the 1967 Pan American Games
Fulbright alumni